The close central rounded vowel, or high central rounded vowel, is a type of vowel sound used in some spoken languages. Both the symbol and the sound are commonly referred to as "barred u".

The close central rounded vowel is the vocalic equivalent of the rare labialized post-palatal approximant .

In most languages this rounded vowel is pronounced with protruded lips (endolabial). However, in a few cases the lips are compressed (exolabial).

Some languages feature the near-close central rounded vowel, which is slightly lower.

Close central protruded vowel
As there is no dedicated diacritic for protrusion in the IPA, symbol for the close central rounded vowel with an old diacritic for labialization, can be used as an ad hoc symbol  for the close central protruded vowel.

Features

Occurrence
Because central rounded vowels are assumed to have protrusion, and few descriptions cover the distinction, some of the following may actually have compression.

Close central compressed vowel

As there is no official diacritic for compression in the IPA, the centering diacritic is used with the front rounded vowel , which is normally compressed.

Features

Occurrence
It occurs in some dialects of Swedish, but see also close front compressed vowel. The close back vowels of Norwegian and Swedish are also compressed. See close back compressed vowel. It also occurs in Japanese as an allophone. Medumba has a compressed central vowel  where the corners of the mouth are not drawn together.

See also
Close back compressed vowel
Close front protruded vowel

Notes

References

 

 
 
 
 
 
 
 
 
 
 
 

 
 
 
 
 
 
 
 
 
 
 
 
 
 
 
 
 
 
  A summary of the presentation can be found here.

External links
 

Close vowels
Central vowels
Rounded vowels